Arena da Floresta is a multi-use stadium in Rio Branco, Acre, Brazil.  It is currently used mostly for football matches.  The stadium holds 13,534. It was built in 2006.

History
The stadium, built in 2006, was inaugurated on December 17 of that year, when Rio Branco-AC beat Brazil national under-20 football team 2–1. The stadium's attendance record currently stands at 23,000, set on that match.

References

Football venues in Acre (state)
Sports venues in Acre (state)
Sports venues completed in 2006
Rio Branco, Acre